A Pobra do Caramiñal is a town and municipality at the entrance of one of the lower bays of the Galician coastline known as the Ria de Arousa in the province of A Coruña, Spain. It is located in the autonomous community of Galicia. A Pobra do Caramiñal belongs to the comarca of A Barbanza. It is the next stop out of the ria (bay or more apropos fjord) after Boiro and is famous for its unusual festival procession in September. A Pobra do Caramiñal features a large harbor with docks for commercial and leisure craft, the Alameda, the Old Town, and a popular beach.

Demographics 
from INE Archiv

A Pobra do Caramiñal’s harbour
The harbour in A Pobra do Caramiñal is a tourist destination. The port is open to the public; fishing boats on display range from dinghy-sized dornas to industrial-sized fishing boats moored up at a quay that extends into the bay.

A footpath runs the length of the harbor and parallel to the beach, leading to the second section of the port which contains yachts, speedboats, and other non-commercial craft. Two beaches in A Pobra flew the Blue Flag of the EU until their withdrawal in 2015 because of the lack of lifeguards.

References 

Pobra del Caraminal, A
Fishing communities in Spain